At the 2002 FIFA World Cup, Brazil participated for the 17th time in the event. The country remained as the only national team to have participated in every installment of the FIFA World Cup. Brazil won all seven matches they played, achieving the highest number of matches won by a team in a single tournament in the history of the FIFA World Cup. Brazil reached the final where they defeated Germany 2–0.

Squad
Head coach: Luiz Felipe Scolari

Brazil vs Turkey

Brazil vs China PR

Costa Rica vs Brazil

Brazil vs Belgium

England vs Brazil

Brazil vs Turkey

Final

References

 
Countries at the 2002 FIFA World Cup
02